This is an incomplete list of the pupils of Jean-Léon Gérôme.

Laureano Barrau
Henri Beau
Osman Hamdi Bey
Pascal Dagnan-Bouveret
Georges Ferdinand Bigot
Frederick Arthur Bridgman
George de Forest Brush
Edwin Lord Weeks
George Bridgman
Dennis Miller Bunker
Eugène Burnand
Mary Cassatt
Gustave-Claude-Etienne Courtois
Kenyon Cox
William de Leftwich Dodge
Wynford Dewhurst, R.B.A.
Thomas Millie Dow
Thomas Eakins
Wyatt Eaton
Albert Edelfelt
Delphin Enjolras
Herbert Cyrus Farnum
Jacques Gay
Gabriel Guay
Edmund Aubrey Hunt
Henri-Paul Motte
Henry Siddons Mowbray
Aloysius O'Kelly
Lawton S. Parker
William McGregor Paxton
Paul Peel
R. G. Harper Pennington
William Picknell
Théophile Poilpot
Théodore Ralli
Odilon Redon
Jules Ernest Renoux
Carl Frederick von Saltza
Julius LeBlanc Stewart
Abbott Handerson Thayer
Vasili Vasilyevich Vereshchagin
Douglas Volk
J. Alden Weir
William Stott of Oldham
Hosui Yamamoto

References

Academic art
Lists of artists
Jean-Léon Gérôme
Gerome